Governor McEnery may refer to:

John McEnery (Louisiana politician) (1833–1891), 25th Governor of Louisiana
Samuel D. McEnery (1837–1910), 30th Governor of Louisiana